The 1980 Avon Championships of Houston  was a women's tennis tournament played on indoor carpet courts at the Summit in Houston, Texas in the United States that was part of the 1980 Avon Championships Circuit. It was the 10th edition of the tournament and was held from February 25 through March 2, 1980. Third-seeded Billie Jean King won the singles title and earned $30,000 first-prize money.

Finals

Singles
 Billie Jean King defeated  Martina Navratilova 6–1, 6–3
 It was King's 2nd title of the year and the 125th of her career.

Doubles
 Billie Jean King /  Ilana Kloss defeated  Betty Stöve /  Wendy Turnbull 3–6, 6–1, 6–4

Prize money

References

External links
 Women's Tennis Association (WTA) tournament edition details
 International Tennis Federation (ITF) tournament edition details

Avon Championships of Houston
Virginia Slims of Houston
Avon Championships of Houston
Avon Championships of Houston
Avon Championships of Houston
Avon Championships of Houston
Avon Championships of Houston